Airport Live is a live television programme broadcast on BBC Two over four nights from 17 June 2013 to 20 June 2013. The show was commissioned following the success of other "live" programmes such as Volcano Live.The show was presented by Kate Humble, Dan Snow, Anita Rani and Dallas Campbell from Heathrow Airport in London.  Dallas Campbell, Anita Rani and Dan Snow presented segments, which attempted to discover the principles behind Heathrow Airport. Airport Live also featured pre-recorded reports and interviews in addition to the real-time broadcast. Live cameras showed airport activity from around the airport and online features included the history of the airport site.

Episode list
Episode viewing figures from Broadcasters' Audience Research Board (BARB).

See also
 The Railway: Keeping Britain On Track
 The Route Masters: Running London's Roads
 The Tube (2012 TV series)

References

External links
 

2010s British documentary television series
2013 British television series debuts
2013 British television series endings
BBC television documentaries
Documentary television series about aviation
English-language television shows
Television shows set in London